Valentin Giraud Moine (born 23 January 1992) is a French World Cup alpine ski racer and specializes in the speed events of downhill and super-G.

Biography

Born in Gap, Hautes-Alpes, Giraud Moine made his World Cup debut in November 2013 in the downhill in Lake Louise, Canada. His first podium was in downhill in March 2016 at Kvitfjell, Norway.

On 27 January 2017, Giraud Moine was injured after crashing while competing in the men's  World Cup downhill at Garmisch-Partenkirchen, and he was airlifted to a hospital. He dislocated both knees and could have lost the use of his legs without the rapid medical intervention.

Giraud Moine recovered from his injuries and went on to win the Final European Cup Downhill ranking in 2020. In December 2020, he finished 14th in the Val d'Isère downhill.

He competed as sighted guide for Hyacinthe Deleplace at the 2022 Winter Paralympics held in Beijing, China.

World Cup results

Season standings

Race podiums
 2 podiums – (2 DH); 6 top tens

References

External links
 
 Valentin Giraud Moine World Cup standings at the International Ski Federation
 
 French Ski Team – 2021 men's B team 

1992 births
French male alpine skiers
Living people
Paralympic sighted guides